High Test Girls is a 1980 Swiss pornographic film co-written and directed by Erwin C. Dietrich. It stars Brigitte Lahaie, Jane Baker, Nadine Pascal, France Lomay, Flore Sollier and Élodie Delage. The film is a sequel to Sechs Schwedinnen im Pensionat.

Plot
Six young Swedish girls, who caused so much mischief in the girls' boarding school, is transferred to professional life where they are assigned to operate a restaurant with a filling station. One morning a traveler visits them and rings the bell continuously. Kerstin, Inga & Greta all are having sex in their respective rooms while Astrid doing some cardio, riding her exercise bicycle. Only Lil who was masturbating while watching TV hears and attends to him. While the car is being filled, she accompanies him inside and they have sex on the so-fa. Concomitantly, the two TV announcers also start to have sex. Time passes by and the petrol reaches the brim of the tank and overflows. 

In the municipality, Hans the Mayor discuses about the girls with his wife Marie who insists he should monitor them vigilantly and attends a meeting with the town officials. As soon as he leaves, Marie lures town's Congressman who is also supposed to attend the meeting with the Mayor and have sex in Mayor's office room. The official then rushes to the meeting which is held because of his delay. The meeting commences and they discuss about the behavior of the six girls which poses a threat to morality of the town and decides to get rid of the girls.

However, the Sexual encounters continue as Kerstin and Inga lures a couple of guys and have sex with them and Kerstin extends her desired by having sex with the TV with audio guidance by the announcer. In the municipality, when the Major goes out again for a meeting, Marie lures the town's mechanic Harry into her bedroom and they have sex. At the meeting Mayor decides to hire a Lawyer since the girls have legally inherited the land and property. Meanwhile Greta and Kerstin brings value addition to their clients by unwinding them with refreshments and a game of Ludo prior having sex. While watching TV the girls see a man dressed as Santa Clause making a lever device which aids girls to masturbate easily. Kerstin who has a Physics major modifies Astrid's exercise bicycle and fix it with a Dildo which works as you pedal. All the girls try it and enjoys immensely and then goes out for a naked jog in the wilderness. The town's Butcher, Mechanic, School teacher, Congressman and the Mayor pursuits them and takes a sneak peak using Binoculars. 

While Inga accompanies a tired client to have sex, Greta and Kerstin identifies themselves as bisexual while having a smoke. They decide to affirm their new found orientation and engage in lesbian sex. In the municipality, Marie blames the Mayor for still not getting rid of the girls and this time has sex with the Butcher while the Mayor has departed to attend the next town meeting. This time they agree to collect evidence as opposed to the overwhelming complaints received by the town elders. But the girls continue with their sexual frolics more vigorously than ever before. They have multiple visitors in the lobby and Greta lures a very long distance client and have sex. Before their next meeting, Marie has sex this time with the School teacher. In this meeting, the officials are disturbed by the deteriorating municipality building and worries that the town's Philharmonic Orchestra who is scheduled to perform in the town festival in two weeks should be shifted to another location. The most feasible option is agreed as the filling station premises due to its large floor area. 

The following day, the musicians which includes the Butcher, Mechanic, School teacher, Congressman and the Mayor arrive and they shift the furniture in the lobby and starts practicing the Overture as conducted by the Senior band leader. However, the musicians one by one sneaks into the rooms of the girls, gets acquainted to each other and have passionate sex.

Cast

Reception
The website B Movies Heroee found the film worse than its predecessor, stating, "The good Erwin C. Dietrich creates a cheerful comedy soft-core, which has no great pretensions technical or narrative. There is no doubt, Sechs Schwedinnen von der Tankstelle is more absurd than its predecessor". The French blog Alligatographe criticized almost every aspect of the film and concluded, "With no meanings, no talent, no scenario and no comedians, the film bores most of the time".

References

External links
 
 

1980 films
1980s pornographic films
1980s sex comedy films
Swiss pornographic films
1980s German-language films
Teensploitation
Films directed by Erwin C. Dietrich
1980 comedy films